Gray-Dort Motors was a Canadian automobile manufacturer in Chatham, Ontario, Canada, from 1915 to 1925. It started as Canadian carriage works of William Gray & Sons Company Ltd, founded in 1855 by William Gray.  In the mid 1900s Robert Gray (William's father, then president of the company) began to build Ford bodies for the Walkerville factory. They continued to do so until 1912.

During this period, they also built bodies for the locally built Chatham.

In 1915, Robert Gray obtained the Canadian rights to manufacture the Dort automobile from Flint automobile manufacturer J. Dallas Dort and that year Gray-Dort was formed. They produced two models the first year, a Model 4 roadster, and a Model 5 touring car.

Over the years, Gray-Dort became known for their cars of reliable quality, which started easily in all weather conditions. A full range of body styles was offered – tourer, coupe and sedan.

In 1923, after several years of successful but stressful business, J. Dallas Dort decided he wanted to leave the automobile business, and Robert Gray could not dissuade him. A few months later, Dallas Dort died while playing golf. Their easy access to U.S. sources of engineering and mechanical parts having abruptly come to a close, the company began to lose money. Gray-Dort scrambled to find another U.S.-based partner to no avail, and the last few years of its life were spent liquidating assets.

Over the course of its lifetime, Gray-Dort manufactured around 26,000 automobiles.

See also
Dort Motor Car Company

References

External links
Windsor Public Library website
Image of the automobiles

Defunct motor vehicle manufacturers of Canada
Cars of Canada
Vehicle manufacturing companies established in 1885
Defunct companies of Ontario
History of manufacturing in Ontario
1923 disestablishments
Brass Era vehicles
1900s cars
1910s cars
1920s cars
Canadian companies established in 1855